Wilfried Domoraud (born 18 August 1988) is a French footballer who plays for Maltese club Gżira United.

Career
Born in Maisons-Alfort, Val-de-Marne, Domoraud was previously contracted to French club AS Nancy, but only appeared for their B team. After scoring a hat-trick for the Yeovil Town reserve team he was handed his first team debut when he came on as a substitute at Brighton & Hove Albion in a 2–1 win.

Domoraud was sent on a month's loan to Conference National side Weymouth in January 2008. He appeared in four league games for the club in January, as well as an FA Trophy match. Despite having five total appearances for the club, he failed to get on the score sheet during the loan spell. He was loaned out again on 13 February 2008, this time to Conference South side Weston-super-Mare. The loan was eventually extended to the end of the 2007–08 season, with Domoraud making 14 league appearances, scoring five goals in the process.

He was released by Yeovil in July, before signing for Woking on a non-contract deal on 1 September 2008 following a trial. He signed a contract with Woking in October. Manager Phil Gilchrist rated Domoraud at a price of £250,000 during the January 2009 transfer window, amid interest from other clubs. His first competitive hat trick for Woking came on 31 January 2009 when Woking beat Northwich Victoria 4–1 at Kingfield Stadium. His first hat trick was for Yeovil reserves in the 2007–08 season. He re-signed for Woking on 1 October 2009 on a non-contract deal. He made his debut in a 2–0 victory over Chelmsford City, scoring the opening goal.

Club statistics
.

References

 Hobro tilknytter fransk kantspiller, bold.dk, 31 January 2016

External links
 
 

1988 births
Living people
People from Maisons-Alfort
French sportspeople of Ivorian descent
French footballers
Association football midfielders
AS Nancy Lorraine players
Yeovil Town F.C. players
Weymouth F.C. players
Weston-super-Mare A.F.C. players
Woking F.C. players
TSV Hartberg players
SV Mattersburg players
FC Admira Wacker Mödling players
AC Arlésien players
Hobro IK players
Ħamrun Spartans F.C. players
Gżira United F.C. players
Ligue 2 players
English Football League players
National League (English football) players
Austrian Football Bundesliga players
Danish Superliga players
Danish 1st Division players
Maltese Premier League players
French expatriate footballers
Expatriate footballers in England
Expatriate footballers in Austria
Expatriate men's footballers in Denmark
Expatriate footballers in Malta
French expatriate sportspeople in England
French expatriate sportspeople in Austria
French expatriate sportspeople in Denmark
French expatriate sportspeople in Malta
Footballers from Val-de-Marne